Encrasicholina punctifer, known as the buccaneer anchovy, or in Hawaiian as nehu, is an anchovy of the family Engraulidae that is widespread in the Indo-Pacific.

Description
The buccaneer anchovy is widespread in the Indo-Pacific and measures 13 centimeters long.

Biology
The buccaneer anchovy feeds on plankton. It is chiefly marine, frequenting in schools.

References

Food 
The buccaneer anchovy is usually used for bait or used for minor commercial importance and is very important for being the one of the food sources for large pelagic fishes and tuna.

Fish of Hawaii
Fish of the Pacific Ocean
Fish described in 1938
punctifer